Vamuna remelana is a species of moth of the subfamily Arctiinae first described by Frederic Moore in 1866. It is found in India (Arunachal Pradesh, Assam, Mizoram, Sikkim, Uttarakhand, West Bengal), Peninsular Malaysia, Sumatra, Borneo and Java.

References

Moths described in 1866
Lithosiina